Carmichaelia carmichaeliae is a species of plant in the family Fabaceae. It is found only in South Island of New Zealand.  It is classified as having the "Nationally Critical" conservation status under the New Zealand Threat Classification System.

References

carmichaeliae
Flora of New Zealand
Near threatened plants
Taxonomy articles created by Polbot
Taxa named by Joseph Dalton Hooker